The December 2014 Kabul bombings refer to series of bombings that happened on December 11, 2014, in Kabul, Afghanistan.

First attack
The first attack was carried out by the Taliban and was targeting Afghan soldiers. During the attack six of the soldiers were killed.

Second attack
Couple hours later a second attack was carried out by a 16-year-old who blew himself up at the French high school's auditorium which killed 6 civilians and wounded 16 more. The auditorium was showing a play called Heartbeat: Silence After the Explosion which ironize the event. After the explosion there was panic which was followed by investigation during which the witnesses claimed that it all happened back stage with reporters and their TV cameras were covering the event. The Taliban have claimed responsibility for this attack as well, and said that the play undermined Islamic values. According to BBC reporter Mike Wooldridge, the attack was meant to undermine confidence among Afghans in the new government and its security forces.

After the investigation it was revealed by the Afghan Deputy Interior Minister Mohammad Ayoub Salangi that one of the bodies belonged to a German national.

Condemnations
The attack was condemned by the Laurent Fabius who said that no French citizens were hurt in the attack. It was also condemned by French President Francois Hollande who called it "odd" and was quoting saying by U-T San Diego:
By attacking this target, the terrorists were targeting culture and creativity

See also
 List of terrorist attacks in Kabul

References

2014 murders in Afghanistan
Terrorist incidents in Kabul
Terrorist incidents in Afghanistan in 2014
Improvised explosive device bombings in Afghanistan
Mass murder in 2014
Mass murder in Kabul
Massacres in Afghanistan
2014 in Kabul
December 2014 events in Afghanistan
Attacks on buildings and structures in Afghanistan
Attacks in Afghanistan in 2014